The Man Who Cried Wolf is a 1937 American film directed by Lewis R. Foster to a screenplay by Charles Grayson from Arthur Rohlsfel's story Too Clever to Live. The film featured Lewis Stone, Barbara Read, Tom Brown. The plot concerns an actor preparing for a real murder by confessing to police to murders that he didn't commit.

Cast
 Lewis Stone as Lawrence Fontaine
 Barbara Read as Nan
 Tom Brown as Tommy Bradley
 Forrester Harvey as Jocko
 Jameson Thomas as George Bradley
 Marjorie Main as Amelia Bradley
 Robert Gleckler as Capt. Walter Reid
 Billy Wayne as Halligan

References

External links
 

1937 films
Films directed by Lewis R. Foster
American crime films
American black-and-white films
1930s American films